is a Japanese author and practitioner of Japanese martial arts. Tokitsu has also written a scholarly work about the legendary swordsman Musashi Miyamoto. He holds doctorates in sociology and in Japanese language and civilization.

Biography
Kenji Tokitsu was born on 1 August 1947 in Yamaguchi, Japan. A practitioner of Shotokan karate since youth, in 1984 Tokitsu started his own school, the Shaolin-mon ("door to Shaolin", compare the Mumonkan) school in Paris, where he had taught Shotokan karate since 1971. The Shaolin-mon teachings were a hybrid of Tokitsu's dissatisfaction with Shotokan karate combined with what he learned of Chinese martial arts. Still later, he founded the Tokitsu-ryu Academy in 2001.

He was interviewed for his thoughts on Japanese culture in Chris Marker's 1996 documentary film Level Five.

Books
Tokitsu, Kenji, The Inner Art of Karate: Cultivating the Budo Spirit in Your Practice, trans. 2012, 
–––––, Ki and the Way of the Martial Arts, trans. 2003, 
–––––, Miyamoto Musashi: His Life and Writings, trans. 2004 by Sherab Chödzin Kohn (from the French Miyamoto Musashi, 2000), Boston: Shambhala,  (1st ed., hbk)

References
Shambhala, Biographical article and bibliography at Shambhala Publications
Tokitsu, www.tokitsu.com
Tokitsu, www.tokitsu.com
Tokitsu, www.tokitsu.com

Notes

External links
 www.tokitsuryu.it (new official website)
 YouTube video of Kenji

1947 births
Living people
Japanese writers
Martial arts writers